Anarita is a village in the Paphos District of Cyprus, located  northeast of Timi.

References

Notes

Communities in Paphos District